Torben Emil Meyer (1 December 1884 – 22 May 1975) was a Danish-American character actor who appeared in more than 190 films in a 55-year career. He began his acting career in Europe before moving to the United States.

Early life
Meyer was born in Aarhus, Denmark and began his career as a stage actor.

Starting in 1912 Meyer acted in 20 European silent movies, culminating with Don Quixote in 1926. He emigrated to the United States in 1927.

Hollywood acting career
Danish friends Benjamin Christensen and Jean Hersholt may have helped Meyer obtain his first roles in Hollywood films. For decades Meyer found roles playing characters from many countries. A 1948 newspaper article stated Meyer can't complain about being typecast for he speaks German in Sealed Verdict, was a 17th century Dutch sea captain in The Exile, a French professor in To the Victor, and the headwaiter in Variety Girl.

Horror films
Meyer became a member of the "all-star peasant cast" in The Black Room, and considered Boris Karloff to be a good friend. He played the Dane in Murders in the Rue Morgue, and was strangled by Boris Karloff in Bride of Frankenstein. Meyer was Gaston, the night watchman, in the 1958 film The Fly

Preston Sturges films
Meyer was in numerous Preston Sturges films, and addressed him as Maitre (French for director). Meyers played Mr. Schmidt in Christmas in July, Purser in The Lady Eve, Doctor in both Sullivan's Travels and The Miracle of Morgan's Creek, Mr. Schultz in Hail the Conquering Hero, Dr. Dahlmeyer in The Great Moment, Barber in The Sin of Harold Diddlebock, and Dr. Schultz in The Beautiful Blonde from Bashful Bend.

Later roles
In 1961, when Meyer was 76 years old, he played Werner Lampe, an ex-Nazi judge on trial in Judgment at Nuremberg. His last film role was in A New Kind of Love, released in 1963, and his last television role was as Pedro Sven in the 1966 I Dream of Jeannie episode Jeannie Breaks the Bank''.

Honored by King of Denmark
In 1962 Frederick IX of Denmark honored Meyer with the Knights’ Cross of the Order of the Dannebrog. It was presented to him by the consul general of Denmark, Honorable A. C. Karsten.

Death
On 22 May 1975 Meyer died of bronchial pneumonia in Hollywood, California. He was cremated, and his remains are vaulted in the Chapel of the Pines.

Filmography

References

External links

 
 
 
 

1884 births
1975 deaths
American male film actors
American male silent film actors
Danish male film actors
Danish male silent film actors
20th-century Danish male actors
Deaths from bronchopneumonia
Deaths from pneumonia in California
20th-century American male actors
Burials at Chapel of the Pines Crematory
Danish emigrants to the United States
Male actors from Copenhagen